This article lists the main target shooting events and their results for 2018.

World Events

International Shooting Sport Federation

ISSF World Shooting Championships
 September 2 - 14: 2018 ISSF World Shooting Championships held in Changwon, South Korea.

ISSF World Cup
 2018 ISSF World Cup
 2018 ISSF Junior World Cup

International Practical Shooting Confederation
 2018 IPSC Action Air World Shoot
 2018 IPSC Shotgun World Shoot

FITASC
2018 Results

Commonwealth Games
 April 8 - 14: Shooting at the 2018 Commonwealth Games, Gold Coast, Australia

Regional Events

Africa

Americas

Shooting Championships of the Americas
 November 3 - 10: 2018 Shooting Championships of the Americas, Guadalajara, Mexico

Asia

Asian Shooting Championships
 November 2 - 12: 2018 Asian Airgun Championships
 November 2 - 12: 2018 Asian Shotgun Championships

Asian Games
 August 19 - 28: Shooting at the 2018 Asian Games

Europe

European 10metre Event Championships
 February 16 - 26: 2018 European 10 m Events Championships held in Győr, Hungary.

10m Men's Air Rifle
 : 
 : 
 : 

10m Women's Air Rifle
 : 
 : 
 : 

10m Men's Air Pistol
 : 
 : 
 : 

10m Women's Air Pistol
 : 
 : 
 :

European Shotgun Championships
 July 30 - August 13: 2018 European Shotgun Championships

Mediterranean Games
 June 23 - 24: Shooting at the 2018 Mediterranean Games

"B Matches"
 February 1-4: InterShoot in Den Haag, Netherlands
 December 12-15: RIAC held in Strassen, Luxembourg

National Events

United Kingdom

NRA Imperial Meeting
 July, held at the National Shooting Centre, Bisley
 Queen's Prize winner: 
 Grand Aggregate winner: J Corbett
 Ashburton Shield winners: Sedbergh School
 Kolapore Winners: 
 National Trophy Winners: 
 Elcho Shield winners: 
 Vizianagram winners: House of Commons

NSRA National Meeting
 August, held at the National Shooting Centre, Bisley
 Earl Roberts British Prone Champion:

USA
 2018 NCAA Rifle Championships, won by Kentucky Wildcats

References

 
2018 in sports
2018 sport-related lists